Brive–La Roche Airport or Aérodrome de Brive – La Roche  was an airport located  west of Brive-la-Gaillarde, a commune of the Corrèze department in the Nouvelle-Aquitaine region of France.

History
As of February 2011, the aerodrome is due for closure, and only accepts locally based planes. A new airport known as Brive–Souillac Airport or Brive–Dordogne Valley Airport opened on June 15, 2010. The Airlinair (now HOP!) flights to and from Paris–Orly airport have been transferred to this new airport as have all other passenger services.

References

External links 

 Aérodrome de Brive-Laroche at Communauté d'Agglomération de Brive  
 

Airports in Nouvelle-Aquitaine
Buildings and structures in Corrèze